Barra del Chuy is a resort (balneario) in the Rocha Department of southeastern Uruguay. Its name means Mouth of Chui (stream). It is the last coastal resort of Uruguay, bordering Brazil to the southeast with the stream Arroyo Chui as the natural border.

Geography
The resort is located on the coast of the Atlantic Ocean,  in a southeastern direction into a road that spits from Route 9 about  before Chuy. It borders the resort Puimayen to the southwest.

History 

Population
In 2011 Barra del Chuy had a population of 370 permanent inhabitants and 1,021 dwellings.
 
Source: Instituto Nacional de Estadística de Uruguay

References

External links
INE map of Barra del Chuy and Puimayen
Tourist information for Barra del Chuy
Main Portal Barra del Chuy
Brief history of the resort

Populated places in the Rocha Department
Seaside resorts in Uruguay